Richard Critz (October 16, 1877 – April 1, 1959) was a justice of the Supreme Court of Texas from May 1935 to January 1945.

References

Justices of the Texas Supreme Court
1877 births
1959 deaths